Pyroderces tersectella is a moth in the family Cosmopterigidae. It is found in Colombia.

References

Natural History Museum Lepidoptera generic names catalog

tersectella
Moths described in 1877